Person to Person is the debut album by jazz vocalist Mildred Anderson featuring saxophonist Eddie "Lockjaw" Davis' working group with organist Shirley Scott recorded in 1960 and released on the Bluesville label.

Reception

AllMusic reviewer Scott Yanow stated: "this set is worth checking out if quite obscure". Chris Smith wrote in The Penguin Guide to Blues Recordings: "her pitch is sometimes uncertain and her interpretations are anonymous, neither sweet enough for ballads nor salty enough for blues."

Track listing 
 "I'm Gettin' 'Long Alright" (Bobby Sharp, Charles Singleton) - 2:44  
 "I'm Free" (Singleton) - 4:57  
 "Don't Deceive Me (Please Don't Go)" (Chuck Willis) - 4:33  
 "Hello Little Boy" (Mildred Anderson) - 3:47  
 "Person to Person" (Wally Gold) - 3:07  
 "Cool Kind of Poppa" (Anderson) - 2:57  
 "Kidney Stew Blues" (Leona Blackman, Eddie "Cleanhead" Vinson) - 3:50  
 "I Didn't Have a Chance" (Curry) - 4:45

Personnel 
 Mildred Anderson - vocals
 Eddie "Lockjaw" Davis - tenor saxophone
 Shirley Scott - organ
 George Duvivier - bass
 Arthur Edgehill - drums

References 

1960 albums
Mildred Anderson albums
Eddie "Lockjaw" Davis albums
Albums produced by Esmond Edwards
Albums recorded at Van Gelder Studio
Bluesville Records albums